Michael J. Rodrigues (born May 30, 1959) is a Democratic member of the Massachusetts Senate representing the 1st Bristol and Plymouth district. He is a resident of Westport who has served since January 2011. From 1996 to 2011 he was a member of the Massachusetts House of Representatives from the 8th Bristol district. Prior to serving in the Massachusetts legislature, he was a member of the Westport Democratic Town Committee and chairman of the Westport Finance Committee.

See also
 2019–2020 Massachusetts legislature
 2021–2022 Massachusetts legislature

References

External links 
 Campaign web site
 State web site

1959 births
Hispanic and Latino American state legislators in Massachusetts
Democratic Party members of the Massachusetts House of Representatives
Democratic Party Massachusetts state senators
People from Westport, Massachusetts
Living people
University of Massachusetts Dartmouth alumni
21st-century American politicians